Prignitz is a Kreis (district) in northwestern Brandenburg, Germany. Neighboring districts, clockwise from the north, are Ludwigslust-Parchim (in Mecklenburg-Western Pomerania), Ostprignitz-Ruppin (Brandenburg), Stendal (Saxony-Anhalt), and Lüchow-Dannenberg (Lower Saxony).

Geography
The term Prignitz originally meant the region north of the confluence of the Elbe and Havel rivers. This region is larger than the district. It also includes the town of Havelberg in Saxony-Anhalt and large portions of the neighbouring district of Ostprignitz-Ruppin.

The Elbe river forms the southwestern border of the district.

History
The historical region Prignitz consisted of the following eleven districts, established in the 13th century: Wittenberge, Lenzen, Perleberg, Putlitz, Kyritz, Nitzow, Wittstock, Pritzwalk, Havelberg, Wusterhausen and Grabow.

The present district of Prignitz was created in 1993 by merging the previous districts of Pritzwalk and Perleberg and a few municipalities from the district Kyritz. The westernmost part of the district was previously part of Mecklenburg-Western Pomerania and became part of Brandenburg on August 1, 1992.

The earlier district of Prignitz was the buffer between Brandenburg and Mecklenburg. It was resettled by Germans, especially from the Bremen area, following the First Wendish Crusade of 1147. The rate of German settlement increased over the following decades. The eastern half was dominated by the pro-German counts von Plotho who brought their own vassals such as the von Blumenthal and von Grabow families with them. The western half was dominated by robber barons, especially the Gans zu Putlitz family and their vassals, the von Quitzows. When Frederick, Count of Zollern was appointed Margrave in 1411, he faced an uprising of the Wendish nobility, supported by the Wendish Duke of Mecklenburg. However, he was able to put down the revolt at the battle of the Cremmer Dam, with the support of the German nobility. Families who had stayed loyal were rewarded. Otto von Blumenthal, for example, was made Captain of the Prignitz from 1415 to 1422 and of Lenzen from 1420.

Demography

Coat of arms

The coat of arms shows a goose preparing for flight, the symbol of the Gans zu Putlitz family (Gans is German for goose), who in the 12th century were one of a number of families (such as the von Plotho, von Blumenthal and von Arnim families) who introduced Christianity and German culture to Prignitz. The pearls around the goose symbolize Perleberg (which translates to Pearl Mountain). The wolf at bottom stands for the former administrative seat, Pritzwalk, as walk derives from the Slavonic wolk meaning wolf. The wavy separation between the top and bottom symbolizes the river Elbe; the colors red and white are those of Brandenburg.

Towns and municipalities

References

External links

Official website
Portal site for Prignitz
Prignitz images

 
Regions of Brandenburg
Historical regions in Germany
1993 establishments in Germany